The 2012–13 Bobsleigh World Cup was a multi race competition over a season for bobsleigh. The season started on 9 November 2012 in Lake Placid, United States and ended on 17 February 2013 in Sochi, Russia. The World Cup is organised by the FIBT who also run World Cups and Championships in skeleton.

Calendar 
Below is the schedule of the 2012/13 season.

Results

Two-man

Four-man

Two-woman

Standings

Two-man

Four-man

Two-woman

See also
 FIBT World Championships 2013

References

External links 
 FIBT

Bobsleigh World Cup
World Cup
World Cup